Ethan Van der Ryn (born October 21, 1962) is an American sound editor.

He won 2 Academy Awards for Best Sound Editing for The Lord of the Rings: The Two Towers  and King Kong. He earned further Academy Awards nominations for Transformers (2007), Transformers: Dark of the Moon (2011), Argo (2012), and A Quiet Place (2018). He is an alumnus of San Francisco State University.

References

External links

1962 births
Living people
People from Alameda, California
American sound editors
Best Sound Editing Academy Award winners
San Francisco State University alumni